The Lone Rider Crosses the Rio is a 1941 American Western film directed by Sam Newfield and written by William Lively. The film stars George Houston as the Lone Rider and Al St. John as his sidekick "Fuzzy" Jones, with Roquell Verria, Charles King, Julian Rivero and Stephen Chase. The film was released on February 28, 1941, by Producers Releasing Corporation.

This is the second movie in the "Lone Rider" series, which spans 17 films—eleven starring George Houston, and a further six starring Robert Livingston.

Houston, once an opera singer, sang three songs in this film: "It's a Gay Fiesta", "Git Along Cowboy" and "I'm Pancho, the Mexican Bandit". The songs were written by Johnny Lange and Lew Porter.

Plot
Tom, The Lone Rider, is hiding out from bad-guys in Mexico with his friend Fuzzy. While there, Tom and Fuzzy agree to help the son of a Mexican mayor fake his own kidnapping so he can continue an affair the young man is having with a cabaret singer despite his father's objections. Unfortunately, when the young man is really kidnapped, Tom and Fuzzy take the blame.

Cast          
George Houston as Tom Cameron, the Lone Rider
Al St. John as Fuzzy Jones
Roquell Verria as Rosalie
Charles King as Jarvis
Julian Rivero as Pedro
Stephen Chase as Hatfield 
Thornton Edwards as Manuel Torres
Howard Masters as Francisco Torres
Jay Wilsey as Bart
Frank Ellis as Fred
Frank Hagney as Marty
Felipe Turich as Lieutenant Mendoza

See also
The "Lone Rider" films starring George Houston:
 The Lone Rider Rides On (1941)
 The Lone Rider Crosses the Rio (1941)
 The Lone Rider in Ghost Town (1941)
 The Lone Rider in Frontier Fury (1941)
 The Lone Rider Ambushed (1941)
 The Lone Rider Fights Back (1941)
 The Lone Rider and the Bandit (1942)
 The Lone Rider in Cheyenne (1942)
 The Lone Rider in Texas Justice (1942)
 Border Roundup (1942)
 Outlaws of Boulder Pass (1942)
starring Robert Livingston: 
 Overland Stagecoach (1942)
 Wild Horse Rustlers (1943)
 Death Rides the Plains (1943)
 Wolves of the Range (1943)
 Law of the Saddle (1943)
 Raiders of Red Gap (1943)

References

External links
 

1941 films
American Western (genre) films
1941 Western (genre) films
Producers Releasing Corporation films
Films directed by Sam Newfield
American black-and-white films
1940s English-language films
1940s American films